Lezerea (meaning herd's ruin) is a farmstead near Wendron in Cornwall, England, UK.

See also

 List of farms in Cornwall

References

Farms in Cornwall